Nadhour is a town and commune in the Zaghouan Governorate, Tunisia. As of 2004 it had a population of 5,207.

See also
List of cities in Tunisia

References

Populated places in Zaghouan Governorate
Communes of Tunisia
Tunisia geography articles needing translation from French Wikipedia